Mokra Lewa  is a village in the administrative district of Gmina Skierniewice, within Skierniewice County, Łódź Voivodeship, in central Poland.

The village has a population of 810.

References

Mokra Lewa